Astrangia is a genus of stony corals in the family Rhizangiidae. Members of this genus are non-reef building corals and are found in the Atlantic and Indo-Pacific Oceans. They are solitary corals with large polyps and are found in clumps. They reproduce from stolons. The corallites are small with simple toothed septa.

Species
The World Register of Marine Species includes the following species in the genus:

Astrangia atrata (Dennant, 1906)
Astrangia browni Palmer, 1928
Astrangia californica Durham & Barnard, 1952
Astrangia conferta Verrill, 1870
Astrangia costata Verrill, 1866
Astrangia dentata Verrill, 1866
Astrangia equatorialis Durham & Barnard, 1952
Astrangia haimei Verrill, 1866
Astrangia howardi Durham & Barnard, 1952
Astrangia macrodentata Thiel, 1940
Astrangia mercatoris Thiel, 1941
Astrangia poculata (Ellis & Solander, 1786)
Astrangia rathbuni Vaughan, 1906
Astrangia solitaria (Lesueur, 1817)
Astrangia woodsi Wells, 1955

References

Rhizangiidae
Scleractinia genera